HMS Britannia was a 100-gun first rate ship of the line of the Royal Navy, built by Phineas Pett II at Chatham Dockyard, and launched on 27 June 1682. 
	
On 19 May 1692 she was the allied fleet flagship at the Battle of Barfleur.

In 1705 she took on board Charles III of Spain, when on her way to Catalonia

In 1715, Britannia was ordered to be taken to pieces and rebuilt at Woolwich Dockyard, from where she relaunched on 30 October 1719, again as a 100-gun first rate.

Britannia was placed on harbour service in 1745, and was broken up in 1749.

She was captained from 1734 to 1736 by Sir Tancred Robinson.

Notes

References

Lavery, Brian (2003) The Ship of the Line - Volume 1: The development of the battlefleet 1650-1850. Conway Maritime Press. .

External links

Ships of the line of the Royal Navy
1680s ships